

Group A

Head coach:  John Obuh

Head coach:  Marco Pezzaiuoli

Head coach:  Emilio Umanzor

Head coach:  José Luís Brown

Group B

Head coach:  Lucho Nizzo

Head coach:  Yutaka Ikeuchi

Head coach:  José Luis González China

Head coach:  Dany Ryser

Group C

Head coach:  Ali Doustimehr

Head coach:  Tariq Saigy

Head coach:  Ramiro Viafara

Head coach:  Albert Stuivenberg

Group D

Head coach:  Abdullah Ercan

Head coach:  Rainer Willfeld

Head coach:  Juan Diego Quesada

Head coach:  Stephen Cain

Group E

Head coach:  Ali Ebrahim

Head coach:  John Kaputa

Head coach:  Ginés Meléndez

Head coach:  Wilmer Cabrera

Group F

Head coach:  Roland Marcenaro

Head coach:  Lee Kwang-jong

Head coach:  Otmane Ibrir

Head coach:  Pasquale Salerno

References

External links
 Official Rosters on FIFA official website

FIFA U-17 World Cup squads